An indigenous language, or autochthonous language, is a language that is native to a region and spoken by indigenous peoples. This language is from a linguistically distinct community that originated in the area. Indigenous languages are not necessarily national languages but they can be; for example, Aymara is an official language of Bolivia. Also, national languages are not necessarily indigenous to the country.

Many indigenous peoples worldwide have stopped passing on their ancestral languages to the next generation and have instead adopted the majority language as part of their acculturation into the majority culture. Furthermore, many indigenous languages have been subject to linguicide (language killing). Recognizing their vulnerability, the United Nations proclaimed 2019 the International Year of Indigenous Languages "to draw attention to the critical loss of indigenous languages and the urgent need to preserve, revitalize and promote indigenous languages."

Disappearance
Indigenous languages are disappearing for various reasons, including the mass extinction of entire speaker communities by natural disaster or genocide, aging communities in which the language is not passed on, and oppressive language planning policies that actively seek to eradicate languages. 
In North America since 1600, at least 52 Native American languages have disappeared. There may be more than 7,000 languages that exist in the world today, though many of them have not been recorded because they belong to tribes in rural areas of the world or are not easily accessible. It is estimated that 6,809 "living" languages exist in the world today, with 90% having fewer than 100,000 speakers. That means that roughly 6,100 languages are facing a risk of eventual extinction. Some languages are very close to disappearing:

Forty six languages are known to have just one native speaker while 357 languages have fewer than 50 speakers. Rare languages are more likely to show evidence of decline than more common ones.

Oklahoma provides the backdrop for an example of language loss in the developed world. It boasts the highest density of indigenous languages in the United States. That includes languages originally spoken in the region, as well as those of Native American tribes from other areas that were forcibly relocated onto reservations there. The US government drove the Yuchi from Tennessee to Oklahoma in the early 19th century. Until the early 20th century, most Yuchi tribe members spoke the language fluently. Then, government boarding schools severely punished American Indian students who were overheard speaking their own language. To avoid beatings and other punishments, Yuchi and other Indian children abandoned their native languages in favor of English.

In 2005, only five elderly members of the Yuchi tribe were fluent in the language. These remaining speakers spoke Yuchi fluently before they went to school and have maintained the language despite strong pressure to abandon it.

The situation was not limited to Oklahoma. In the Northwest Pacific plateau, there are no speakers left of the indigenous tribal languages from that area all the way to British Columbia.

Oregon's Siletz reservation, established in 1855, was home to the endangered language Siletz Dee-ni. The reservation held members of 27 different Indian bands speaking many languages. In order to communicate, people adopted Chinook Jargon, a pidgin or hybrid language. Between the use of Chinook Jargon and the increased presence of English, the number of speakers of indigenous languages dwindled.

Other tribes of Native Americans were also forced into government schools and reservations. They were also treated badly if they did not become "civilized," which meant they were to go to Christian churches and speak English. They were forced to give up their tribal religious beliefs and languages. Now, Native Americans are trying to regain some of their lost heritage. They gather at "pow-wow" to share culture, stories, remedies, dances, music, rhythms, recipes and heritage with anyone who wants to learn them.

In January 2008, in Anchorage, Alaska, friends and relatives gathered to bid their last farewell to 89 year old Marie Smith Jones, a beloved matriarch of her community. "As they bid her farewell, they also bid farewell to the Eyak language as Marie was the last fluent speaker of the language."

Learning
Hundreds of indigenous languages around the world are taught by traditional means, including vocabulary, grammar, readings, and recordings.

About 6,000 others can be learned to some extent by listening to recordings made for other purposes, such as religious texts for which translations are available in more widely-known languages.

"Treasure language"
The term "treasure language" was proposed by the Rama people of Nicaragua as an alternative to heritage language, indigenous language, and "ethnic language" since those names are considered pejorative in the local context. The term is now also used in the context of public storytelling events.

The term "treasure language" references the desire of speakers to sustain the use of their mother tongue into the future:

Accordingly, the term may be considered to be distinct from endangered language for which objective criteria are available, or heritage language, which describes an end-state for a language for which individuals are more fluent in a dominant language.

See also

Australian Aboriginal languages
Formosan languages
Language education
Linguistic imperialism
Minority language
Language revitalization
International Day of the World's Indigenous Peoples
Stratum (linguistics)

References

Bibliography
 Frawley, William, & Hill, Kenneth C. (2002) Making Dictionaries: preserving indigenous languages of the Americas. Berkeley: University of California Press.
 Harrison, K. David. (2007) When Languages Die: the extinction of the world's languages and the erosion of human knowledge. New York and London: Oxford University Press.
 Singerman, Robert. (1996) Indigenous languages of the Americas: a bibliography of dissertations and theses. Lanham, MD: Scarecrow Press
 Wurm, S. A. & Heyward, Ian (eds.) (2001) Atlas of the World's Languages in Danger of Disappearing''. Paris: UNESCO Pub.

External links

Alaska Native Language Center (ANLC)
Indigenous Language Institute
Aboriginal Languages of Australia
Austlang: the Australian Indigenous Languages Database at AIATSIS
The Society for the Study of the Indigenous Languages of the Americas (SSILA)
Canadian Indigenous Languages and Literacy Development Institute (CILLDI)

Language
Languages by place in society
Linguistic minorities
Linguistic rights
Indigenous rights